WSMD-FM is a contemporary hit radio formatted broadcast radio station licensed to Mechanicsville, Maryland, serving Southern Maryland and the Northern Neck.  WSMD is owned and operated by Somar Communications, Inc.

External links
Star 98.3 Online

SMD
Radio stations established in 1988
1988 establishments in Maryland
Contemporary hit radio stations in the United States